The Lackawanna Old Road was part of the original mainline of the Delaware, Lackawanna & Western Railroad (DL&W). Opened in 1856, it was for a half-century a part of the line connecting the states of New Jersey and Pennsylvania. The  stretch of existing track between these junctions was relegated to secondary status and became known as the "Old Road".

History 
The Old Road involves one railroad tycoon (John I. Blair) and four railroads: the DL&W, the Jersey Central (CNJ), the Morris & Essex Railroad (M&E), and the Warren Railroad. 

In 1853, construction began on the  Warren Railroad, which  would connect the CNJ at Hampton, New Jersey, and the DL&W's mainline at the Delaware River, in anticipation of an eventual merger between the two older railroads. Expensive to build, the Warren required three large bridges, two tunnels, and much excavation before it opened in 1856. 

In 1862, Oxford Tunnel (also known as Van Nest Gap Tunnel) opened, relieving trains of a slow and arduous climb over Van Nest Gap. The new tunnel, however, did not prevent the collapse of the planned DL&W-CNJ merger.

The M&E quickly emerged as the logical replacement for the CNJ, as it would give the DL&W direct access to the Hudson River. But this time, there would be no bespoke connecting line between the merger partners.

Oxford Tunnel was double-tracked in 1869, and for a few decades, suffered no more serious problems than the intermittent water (and sometimes flooding) also seen in its sister tunnel at Manunka Chunk. By the 1890s, the era's larger locomotives and rolling stock had trouble fitting through the tunnel. In 1901, the railroad installed gauntlet track in the tunnel, effectively turning it into a single-track bottleneck — another reason to build the Lackawanna Cut-Off.

With the opening of the Cut-Off in 1911, the line became known as the Old Road, relegated to a branch line for local freight shipments. It still saw the occasional through train when Cut-Off traffic was heavy and served as the main line in 1941 when a rockslide closed the Cut-Off. The effects of Hurricane Diane caused record flooding along the Delaware River and forced DL&W to reroute trains over part the Old Road. The storm also washed out the Pennsylvania Railroad (PRR) Bel-Del Railroad north of Belvidere, New Jersey, leading the railroad to remove the section north to the junction of the Old Road at Manunka Chunk and end PRR service from Trenton, New Jersey, to East Stroudsburg, Pennsylvania.

Rockport wreck 

The Old Road was the site of the DL&W's most infamous train wreck. On June 16, 1925, a passenger train carrying German-American tourists from Chicago to Hoboken was slated to run over the Cut-Off, but in order to avoid freight trains on the line the special train was diverted onto the Old Road to Port Morris. At Rockport, New Jersey, the train struck debris washed onto a road crossing by a heavy thunderstorm. The train derailed, and killed 47 passengers and three trainmen. In 1995, on the 70th anniversary of the wreck, a stone and plaque was erected at the Rockport crossing to remember the lives lost.

Decline
In April 1970, the Erie Lackawanna Railway (EL) abandoned the Delaware-Washington, New Jersey section. Conrail assumed EL operations in 1976. In 1982, NJ Transit assumed operation of the trackage between Port Morris Junction and Netcong for commuter service.

Port Morris Junction ceased to exist in 1984 when Conrail abandoned the Cut-Off. Warren County removed remaining bridges and abutments over the next several years. Now that the Lackawanna Cut-Off Restoration Project is underway, Port Morris Junction is the connection point of the "Old Road" and the "Cut-Off" once again since 2011.

Some vestiges of the Warren Railroad remain: telegraph poles, tunnels, and a concrete viaduct spanning the Pequest River and the abandoned Lehigh and Hudson River Railway right-of-way near the intersection of State Route 31 and U.S. Route 46 near Buttzville.  The steel bridge across the Delaware River near Delaware, N.J., retains the eastbound track but is no longer in use.

In October 1994, commuter rail service was re-established to Hackettstown by NJ Transit, although the operation west of Netcong was under trackage rights granted by Conrail and then later Norfolk Southern Railway.

In 2011, Port Morris Junction was re-established to serve the Lackawanna Cut-Off Restoration Project.

References

Delaware, Lackawanna and Western Railroad
Erie Lackawanna Railway
Railway lines opened in 1856
Railway lines closed in 1968
Lackawanna Cut-Off
Closed railway lines in the United States
Delaware, Lackawanna and Western Railroad lines